Erastus is an unincorporated community in Mercer County, in the U.S. state of Ohio.

History
A post office was established at Erastus in 1883, and remained in operation until it was discontinued in 1904. By 1907, Erastus had no businesses remaining.

References

Unincorporated communities in Mercer County, Ohio
Unincorporated communities in Ohio